The Malmedy massacre was a German war crime committed by soldiers of the  on 17 December 1944 at the Baugnez crossroads near the city of Malmedy, Belgium, during the Battle of the Bulge (16 December 1944 – 25 January 1945). Soldiers of  summarily killed eighty-four U.S. Army prisoners of war (POWs) who had surrendered after a brief battle. The  soldiers had grouped the U.S. POWs in a farmer's field, where they used machine guns to shoot and kill the grouped POWs; the prisoners of war who survived the gunfire of the massacre then were killed with a coup de grâce gun-shot to the head.

Besides the summary execution of the eighty-four U.S. POWs at the farmer’s field, the term "Malmedy massacre" also includes other  massacres of civilians and POWs in Belgian villages and towns in the time after their first massacre of U.S. POWs at Malmedy; these  war crimes were the subjects of the Malmedy massacre trial (May–July 1946), which was a part of the Dachau trials (1945–1947).

Background

Political 

Military 
The objective of the Third Reich's Ardennes Counteroffensive (Battle of the Bulge, 16 Dec. 1944–25 Jan. 1945) was that the 6th SS Panzer Army, commanded by SS General Sepp Dietrich, was to penetrate and break through the Allied front between the towns of Monschau and Losheimergraben (a cross-border village shared by the municipalities of Hellenthal and Büllingen) in order to then cross the River Meuse, and afterwards assault and capture the city of Antwerp.

After the  infantry had breached the U.S. lines, Peiper was to advance his tanks and armored vehicles on the road to Ligneuville and travel through the towns of Stavelot, Trois-Ponts, and Werbomont in order to reach and seize the bridges over the River Meuse that are in the vicinity of the city of Huy. Because the strategy of the Ardennes Counteroffensive had reserved the roads with the strongest roadway for the bulk traffic of the tanks of the 1st SS Panzer Division Leibstandarte SS Adolf Hitler, the convoys of  traveled secondary roads with weak roadways that proved unsuitable for the weights of armored military vehicles, such as Tiger II tanks.

German advance to the west

German attack 

In December 1944, for the Ardennes Counteroffensive the Germans' initial, strategic position was east of the German-Belgium border and the Siegfried Line, near the town of Losheim, Belgium. To realize the German advance to the west, SS General Dietrich planned for the 6th SS Panzer Army to advance northwest, through Losheimergraben and Bucholz Station, and then drive  through the towns of Honsfeld and Büllingen, and through the villages of Trois-Ponts, to then reach Belgian Route Nationale N23, and then cross the River Meuse.

For their part in the German advance to the west,  was to travel the Lanzerath-Losheimergraben road and advance onto the town of Losheimergraben, immediately following the  infantry tasked to capture the villages and towns immediately west of the International Highway. A destroyed bridge thwarted Peiper's tactical plan; earlier in 1944, the retreating Germans had destroyed the Losheim-Losheimergraben bridge over the railroad, which in mid-December of 1944 prevented  from traveling that route to their objective — the town of Losheimergraben.

Moreover, Peiper's alternative route also was thwarted, because the selected railroad overpass bridge could not bear the weight of armored military vehicles. In the event, the German combat engineers were slow to repair the damaged roadway of the Losheim-Losheimergraben road, which delay detoured the convoy of tanks and armored vehicles of  onto the road through the town of Lanzerath enroute to Bucholz Station.

American counter-attack 
The Germans were surprised that the Ardennes Counteroffensive on the northern front — the frontline "bulge" in the Battle of the Bulge — met much resistance from the U.S. Army; for most of a day, an American reconnaissance platoon of 22 soldiers (18 infantrymen and four artillery observers) battled and delayed approximately 500  paratroops in the village of Lanzerath, Belgium.

At dusk, the German 9th Parachute Regiment (3rd Parachute Division) battled, out-flanked, and captured the American reconnaissance platoon as they withdrew from the fight for want of ammunition to continue the fight — halting the progress of  through the village of Lanzerath. In that battle, the  paratroops killed one of the artillery observers and wounded 14 of the other American soldiers. Upon capturing the American reconnaissance platoon, the paratroops paused their attack out of caution, believing that a greater force of American infantry and tanks was hiding in the woods. For more than 12 hours, the over-cautious soldiers of the 9th Parachute Regiment did not act until the midnight arrival of Peiper's tanks to Lanzerath; then did the  paratroops explore and find the woods empty of American soldiers.

Massacre at Büllingen 
At 4:30 a.m. on 17 December 1944, the 1st SS Panzer Division was approximately 16 hours behind schedule when the convoys departed the village of Lanzerath enroute west to the town of Honsfeld. After capturing Honsfeld, Peiper detoured from his assigned route to seize a small fuel depot in Büllingen, where the  infantry summarily executed dozens of U.S. POWs. Afterwards, Peiper advanced to the west, towards the River Meuse and captured Ligneuville, bypassing the towns of Mödersheid, Schoppen, Ondenval, and Thirimont. The terrain and poor quality of the roads made the advance of  difficult; at the exit to the village of Thirimont, the armored spearhead was unable to travel the road directly to Ligneuville, and Peiper deviated from the planned route, and rather than turn to the left, the armored spearhead turned to the right, and advanced towards the crossroads of Baugnez, which is equidistant from the city of Malmedy and Ligneuville and Waimes.

Massacre at Baugnez crossroads 

On 17 December 1944, between noon and 1:00 p.m.,  approached the Baugnez crossroads, two miles southeast of the city of Malmedy, Belgium. Meanwhile, a U.S. Army convoy of thirty vehicles, from B Battery of the 285th Field Artillery Observation Battalion, was negotiating the crossroads, and then turning right, towards Ligneuville and St. Vith, in order to join the US 7th Armored Division.

After that brief battle with the American convoy, the tanks and armored vehicles of the  convoy continued westwards to Ligneuville; while at the Baugnez crossroads, the  infantry assembled the just-surrendered U.S. POWs in a farmer's field, and added them to another group of U.S. POWs, soldiers who had been captured earlier that day. The prisoners of war who survived the massacre at Malmedy said that a group of approximately 120 U.S. POWs stood in the farmer's field when the  fired machine guns at the grouped POWs. Panicked by the machine gun fire, some POWs ran and fled the field, but the  soldiers shot and killed most of the grouped POWs where they stood; and some G.I.s had dropped to the ground and pretended to be dead. Nonetheless, after the initial machine-gunning of the group of POWs, the  soldiers walked amongst the POW corpses, searching for wounded survivors to kill with a coup de grâce gun-shot to the head. Moreover, some of the POWs who fled the farmer's field had run to and hidden in a café at the Baugnez crossroads; the  then set the café afire, and killed every U.S. POW who escaped the burning building.

Responsibility
There is dispute over which  officer ordered the summary killing of U.S. POWs at Malmedy; both Peiper, who had already left the Baugnez crossroads where the massacre occurred, and the commander of the 1st Panzer Battalion, Werner Poetschke, are each considered most likely responsible. After the end of the war, Poetschke was identified by various persons involved and eyewitnesses as the officer directly responsible for the initiative and for giving the order to subaltern officers to execute the American prisoners near the Baugnez crossroads. Whether or not Peiper himself gave the actual order, in addition to his command responsibility, he was responsible for creating the culture that prevailed in the unit and which viewed the care of prisoners of war as a burden to be avoided.

Massacre revealed 
The first of the 43 survivors of the massacre were encountered by a patrol from the 291st Combat Engineer Battalion at about 2:30 p.m. on 17 December, hours after the massacre.

Unofficial orders spread to not take any SS men prisoner. American soldiers of the 11th Armored Division later summarily executed 80 Wehrmacht POWs in the Chenogne massacre on 1 January 1945.

Recovery and investigation 

Until the Allied counter-attack against the Ardennes Counteroffensive, the crossroads at Baugnez, Belgium, lay behind the Nazi lines until 13 January 1945; and on 14 January, the U.S. Army reached the killing field where the German soldiers had summarily executed 84 U.S. POWs on 17 December 1944. The military investigators photographed the war-crime scene and the frozen, snow-covered corpses where they lay, which then were removed for autopsy and burial.

The forensic investigation documented the gun-shot wounds for the war-crime prosecutions of the enemy officers and soldiers who killed surrendered U.S. POWs. Twenty of the 84 corpses of the soldiers murdered as POWs had gunpowder burn residue on the head, indicating of a coup de grâce gun-shot to the head, a wound not sustained in self-defense. The corpses of 20 soldiers showed evidence of small-calibre gun-shot wounds to the head, without the residue of a gunpowder burn; other POW corpses had one wound to the head, either in the temple or behind an ear; and 10 corpses showed fatal, blunt-trauma injuries to the head, from having been hit or repeatedly hit with a rifle butt until breaking the bones of the skull. The coup de grâce gun-shot wounds to the head were additional to the bullet wounds made by the machine guns. Most of the POW corpses were recovered from a small area in the farmer’s field, indicating that the Germans grouped the U.S. POWs to shoot them dead.

Responsibility 

War crimes trial 

The Malmedy massacre trial, from May to July 1946, established that the commanders in the field bore command responsibility for the  killing surrendered U.S. POWs; specifically  General Josef Dietrich (6th Panzer Army);  Werner Poetschke (1st SS Panzer Division Leibstandarte SS Adolf Hitler); and  Joachim Peiper whose soldiers committed the actual war crime at Malmedy.

Regarding command responsibility for the actions of his officers and soldiers, Dietrich said he received from Hitler superior orders that no quarter would be given to enemy soldiers. Likewise, regarding command responsibility for the actions of his officers and soldiers, Peiper said he received superior orders that no quarter was to be granted, no prisoners taken, and no pity shown towards Belgian civilians.

The Dachau Trials prosecuted and punished war criminals by imposing 43 death sentences, 22 sentences to life-long imprisonment, and eight sentences to short imprisonment. However, none of the death sentences were carried out.

See also 
 List of massacres in Belgium
 Normandy massacres, a series of killings in which up to 156 Canadian prisoners of war were murdered by soldiers of the 12th SS Panzer Division (Hitler Youth) during the Battle of Normandy.
 Wereth Massacre, the torture and killing of 11 African-American prisoners of war in Wereth, committed by the 1st SS Panzer Division on the same day.

Notes

References

Further reading
 Steven P. Remy, The Malmedy Massacre: The War Crimes Trial Controversy (Harvard University Press, 2017), x, 342 pp.

External links 
 Mortuary Affairs Operations At Malmedy – Lessons Learned From A Historic Tragedy, by Major Scott T. Glass. Quartermaster Professional Bulletin, Autumn 1997
 Battle of the Bulge on the Web, Malmedy Massacre resources
 "Massacre at Malmédy during the Battle of the Bulge" (reprint of an article in World War II [2003] by M. Reynolds)
 Gettysburg Daily article on 65th anniversary of the Malmedy Massacre.
 Fatal Crossroads: The Untold Story of the Malmédy massacre at the Battle of the Bulge, Book by Danny S. Parker, November 2011

Massacres in 1944
Massacres in Belgium
Nazi war crimes
World War II prisoner of war massacres by Nazi Germany
Nazi SS
Mass murder in 1944
Battle of the Bulge
1944 in Belgium
World War II massacres
Malmedy
December 1944 events
1944 murders in Belgium